The 6th G7 Summit was held at Venice, Italy between 22 and 23 June 1980. The venue for the summit meetings was the island of San Giorgio Maggiore in the Venetian lagoon.
 
The Group of Seven (G7) was an unofficial forum which brought together the heads of the richest industrialized countries: France, West Germany, Italy, Japan, the United Kingdom, the United States, Canada (since 1976), and the President of the European Commission (starting officially in 1981).  The summits were not meant to be linked formally with wider international institutions; and in fact, a mild rebellion against the stiff formality of other international meetings was a part of the genesis of cooperation between France's president Valéry Giscard d'Estaing and West Germany's chancellor Helmut Schmidt as they conceived the first Group of Six (G6) summit in 1975.

Leaders at the summit
The G7 is an unofficial annual forum for the leaders of Canada, the European Commission, France, West Germany, Italy, Japan, the United Kingdom and the United States. Japanese Prime Minister Masayoshi Ōhira suffered a fatal heart attack on 12 June, only days before the summit; and his colleague, Foreign Minister Saburō Ōkita, led the delegation which represented Japan in his place. Others joining Ōkita in Venice were Finance Minister Noboru Takeshita and the Minister of International Trade and Industry Yoshitake Sasaki who attended the foreign minister's meeting in Ōkita's place.

The 6th G7 summit was the last summit for French President Valéry Giscard d'Estaing and US President Jimmy Carter. It was also the first and only summit for Italian Prime Minister Francesco Cossiga.

Participants
These summit participants are the current "core members" of the international forum:

Japanese Prime Minister Masayoshi Ōhira had died from a heart attack just days before, and the acting PM was unable to attend.

Issues
The summit was intended as a venue for resolving differences among its members. As a practical matter, the summit was also conceived as an opportunity for its members to give each other mutual encouragement in the face of difficult economic decisions.

Gallery

See also
 G8

Notes

References
 Bayne, Nicholas and Robert D. Putnam. (2000).  Hanging in There: The G7 and G8 Summit in Maturity and Renewal. Aldershot, Hampshire, England: Ashgate Publishing. ; OCLC 43186692
 Reinalda, Bob and Bertjan Verbeek. (1998).  Autonomous Policy Making by International Organizations. London: Routledge.  ; ;   OCLC 39013643

External links
 No official website is created for any G7 summit prior to 1995 -- see the 21st G7 summit.
 University of Toronto: G8 Research Group, G8 Information Centre
 G7 1980, delegations & documents

G7 summit
1980 in international relations
G7 summit
G7 summit
G7 summit 1980
G7 summit 1980
G7 summit 1980
1980
G7 summit 1980
June 1980 events in Europe